The Sherna is a river in Vladimir and Moscow Oblasts in Russia. It is a left tributary of the Klyazma. It has a length of 89 km, and a drainage basin of 1890 km². The river is formed by the confluence of the rivers Seraya and Molokcha.

References 

Rivers of Vladimir Oblast
Rivers of Moscow Oblast